The Canton of Troyes-2 is a canton of the Aube department, in northern France. Since the French canton reorganisation which came into effect in March 2015, the communes of the canton of Troyes-2 are:
Les Noës-près-Troyes
Sainte-Savine
Troyes (partly)

References

Troyes-2
Troyes